Édouard Écuyer de le Court (6 September 1901 – 10 February 1951) was a Belgian modern pentathlete. He competed at the 1928 and 1936 Summer Olympics.

References

External links
 

1901 births
1951 deaths
Belgian male modern pentathletes
Olympic modern pentathletes of Belgium
Modern pentathletes at the 1928 Summer Olympics
Modern pentathletes at the 1936 Summer Olympics
People from Ixelles
Sportspeople from Brussels